Pseudoconorbis is a genus of sea snails, marine gastropod mollusks in the family Conidae, the cone snails and their allies.

This species has become a synonym of Conasprella

Species
Species within the genus Pseudoconorbis include:
 Pseudoconorbis adamii L. Bozzetti, 1994: synonym of Genotina adamii (L. Bozzetti, 1994)
 Pseudoconorbis coromandelicus (E.A. Smith, 1894): synonym of Conasprella coromandelica (E. A. Smith, 1894)
 Pseudoconorbis traceyi Tucker & Stahlschmidt, 2010: synonym of Conasprella traceyi (Tucker & Stahlschmidt, 2010)

References

Conidae